Plica pansticta is a species of South American lizard in the family Tropiduridae. The species is found in Venezuela.

References

Plica
Lizards of South America
Reptiles of Venezuela
Reptiles described in 2001
Fauna of the Tepuis